Erich Redman (born 1964) is a Russian-born German actor working primarily in English-language feature films. He appeared in United 93 and the BBC comedy series TLC (TV Series). Other appearances include Saving Private Ryan, U-571 and The Illusionist and Allies.

Partial filmography

Films
Demonsoul (1995) - Richard Kurtz
The Scarlet Tunic (1998) - Strasser
Saving Private Ryan (1998) - German #1
U-571 (2000) - German Bosun
Mystery Play (2001) - Van Vliet
Charlotte Gray (2001) - German Corporal
Two Men Went to War (2002) - German signals officer
The Only Hotel (2003) - Carl
Fat Slags (2004) - Dutch Journalist
The Illusionist (2006) - Count Rainer
United 93 (2006) - Christian Adams
The Flying Scotsman (2006) - Second Cycling Official
How to Film Your Neighbour (2009) - Zukov
Captain America: The First Avenger (2011) - Schneider
Trap for Cinderella (2013) - Dr. Muller
Rush (2013) - German Journalist
Jack Ryan: Shadow Recruit (2014) - Ancient Priest
Allies (2014) - Lieutenant Colonel Kaltz
Woman in Gold (2015) - Nazi Officer
The Danish Girl (2015) - Concierge
Chosen (2016) - Colonel Forbach
Overlord (2018) - Dr. Schmidt

Video games
 Flight of the Amazon Queen (1995) - (Additional Voice(German Version)
 Azrael's Tear (1996) - Voice Over (German Dub)
 Metal Gear Solid (1998) - Hal Emmerich (German Dub)
 Fallout 2 (1998) - Instructing Officer
 Bust A Groove (1998) - (Voice Actors)
 Gumball 3000 (2002) - (Foreign Cast)
 Call of Duty 2 (2005) - German Soldier
 Call of Duty 3 (2006) - German Soldier
 Call of Duty: World at War (2008) - German Soldier
 Club (2008) - Additional Voice
 Raid: World War II (2017) - Franz
 Control (2019) - Dr. Casper Darling

References

External links

BBC
Interview

German male film actors
Living people
Russian emigrants to Germany
Russian male film actors
Place of birth missing (living people)
1964 births